The 1978 Paris Open, also known as the French Indoor Championships,  was a Grand Prix men's tennis tournament played on indoor carpet courts. It was the 9th edition of the Paris Open (later known as the Paris Masters). It took place at the Palais omnisports de Paris-Bercy in Paris, France from 30 October through 5 November 1978. Bob Lutz won the singles title.

Finals

Singles

 Bob Lutz defeated  Tom Gullikson 6–2, 6–2, 7–6
 It was Lutz's 4th title of the year and the 35th of his career.

Doubles

 Bruce Manson /  Andrew Pattison defeated  Ion Țiriac /  Guillermo Vilas 7–6, 6–2
 It was Manson's only title of the year and the 1st of his career. It was Pattison's only title of the year and the 6th of his career.

References

External links 
 ATP tournament profile